Network 10 (commonly known as the 10 Network, Channel 10 or simply 10) is an Australian commercial television network owned by Ten Network Holdings, a division of the Paramount Networks UK & Australia subsidiary of Paramount Global. One of five national free-to-air networks, 10's owned-and-operated stations can be found in the state capital cities of Sydney, Melbourne, Brisbane, Adelaide and Perth while affiliates extend the network to regional areas of the country.

Since 2022, Network 10 is usually the fourth-rated television network and primary channel in Australia, behind the Seven Network, Nine Network and ABC TV. Occasionally, SBS TV beats Ten in the ratings, pushing it into fifth position.

History

Origins
From the introduction of TV in 1956 until 1965 there were three television networks in Australia, the National Television Network (now the Nine Network), the Australian Television Network (now the Seven Network), and the public ABC National Television Service (now ABC TV). In the early 1960s, the Australian Government began canvassing the idea of licensing a third commercial television station in each capital city. This decision was seen by some as a way for the government to defuse growing public dissatisfaction with the dominance of imported overseas programming and the paucity of local content. The first of these third licences was granted to United Telecasters (a consortium of Amalgamated Wireless, Colonial Sugar Refining Company, Email, Bank of New South Wales and the NRMA) on 4 April 1963.

Structurally, the Australian television industry was closely modelled on the two-tiered system that had been in place in Australian radio since the late 1930s. One tier consisted of a network of publicly funded television stations run by the ABC, which was funded by government budget allocation and (until 1972) by fees from television viewer licences. The second tier consisted of the commercial networks and independent stations owned by private operators, whose income came from selling advertising time.

Launch
The network was launched as ATV-0 in Melbourne opened on 1 August 1964 and was owned by the Ansett Transport Industries, which at the time owned one of Australia's two domestic airlines. TEN-10 in Sydney, which opened on 5 April 1965, was originally owned by United Telecasters, which also in July that year opened TVQ-0 in Brisbane. Also opened later that month was SAS-10, serving the city of Adelaide.

The new television network was initially dubbed the Independent Television System or ITS, but in 1970 adopted the title The 0-10 Network, which reflected the channels used by the first two stations launched in the group, ATV and TEN.

Melbourne's ATV was the first station of the network to stage colour broadcasts in 1967, the broadcast was that of the horse races in Pakenham, Victoria, which was seen by network and RCA executives and invited members of the media and press. This would the first of many test colour telecasts for the station, and in tribute to this event, the 0-10 Network adopted the First in Colour slogan in 1974, within months before 1 March 1975 transition to colour broadcasting.

1970–1988: Expansion and original run
For its first five years, the 0-10 Network led a hand-to-mouth existence. By the beginning of the 1970s the network was in a precarious financial position and there were predictions that it would fail.

In 1971, the 0-10 Network first aired Young Talent Time, which was a huge ratings success, and ran for 17 years.

However, the network's true financial reprise came about due to the fact that the controversial adult soap opera serial Number 96, which premiered in March 1972 on the night that "Australian TV lost its virginity". The series broke new ground for Australian television and captured the imagination of viewers like few programs before or since. For the next three years it was consistently Australia's top-rating television program and, not surprisingly, its huge popularity attracted advertisers to Ten en masse, with the result that its revenue increased significantly from $1 million in 1971 to more than $10 million in 1972.

However, the pattern of ratings dominance was already set, and for most of the next five decades from the mid-1960s there was little deviation from the prevalent rankings, with the Nine Network typically in first place, the Seven Network second, 0-10 third and ABC TV fourth.

The gradual evolution of Network Ten into its current form has its origins in the ongoing attempts by media mogul Rupert Murdoch to acquire a prized commercial television licence in Australia's largest capital city market, Sydney. This began when Murdoch's News Limited purchased the Wollongong station WIN-4 in the early 1960s, around the same time he bought Festival Records. In 1977, frustrated by regulatory blocks that prevented him from expanding into the Sydney market, Murdoch sold WIN and purchased a 46% share in Ten Sydney.

In 1979, Murdoch made an unsuccessful takeover bid for the Melbourne-based The Herald and Weekly Times media group, which originally owned HSV-7. Although the bid failed, he gained a 50% stake in Ansett, which thus gave him control of channel 0 in Melbourne.

In 1979, 0-10 first aired the soap opera Prisoner, which was a huge ratings success.

On 20 January 1980, the 0-10 Network became known as Network Ten to reflect ATV moving from channel 0 to channel 10 – although the Brisbane station continued to broadcast as TVQ-0 until 10 September 1988 when the station changed to TVQ-10. In 1987 Adelaide's Network Ten affiliate (SAS-10) and Seven Network affiliate (ADS-7) successfully negotiated to exchange affiliation rights and channel frequencies due to ownership problems. On 27 December 1987, the exchange came into effect and ADS-7, owned by the same owners as the main Network Ten stations, became ADS-10 with SAS-10 converting to SAS-7, operated by TVW-7 in Perth.

When Murdoch became an American citizen in 1985 so that he could expand his media empire in the United States with the Fox network, Australia's media ownership laws obliged him to dispose of the flagship television stations, which were sold to The Northern Star, an offshoot of the Westfield Group conglomerate controlled by property tycoon Frank Lowy. However, Westfield was badly hit by the stock market crash of 1987, and in 1989 sold Network Ten to a consortium led by Charles Curran and former television journalist Steve Cosser.

The network became fully national in 1988 with the launch of NEW-10 in Perth, after the introduction of satellite facilities made it economical for the network to broadcast to Western Australia. Northern Star officially took hold of TVQ-10 later in the year because of swapping frequencies with neighbouring DDQ-0 in Toowoomba and rebranded CTC Canberra under the network banner in time for aggregation.

1989–1994: Receivership and relaunch

In 1989, Ten's ratings were in decline, so on 23 July 1989, recently recruited network boss Bob Shanks relaunched the network, re-branding it as 10 TV Australia, and introduced several new programs, including four new prime time game shows. However, by the end of 1989 the ratings had failed to improve and most of the new programs were cancelled, except for its Eyewitness News newscasts, Neighbours and E Street (debuting in late 1988).

Meanwhile, owners Northern Star Holdings were having financial and regulatory problems. The company was subject to an inquiry by the Australian Broadcasting Tribunal in relation to media ownership rules and had run into financial difficulties following the 1987 stock market crash two years earlier. On 1 September 1989, Northern Star Holdings announced a major restructure to pay off debts and help restore profitability. The proposals included selling off the network's three smaller stations; ADS Adelaide, NEW Perth and CTC Canberra to Charles Curran's Capital Television Group. The sale was complete on 27 October 1989, effectively splitting Northern Star's Network Ten in half.

In September 1990, Northern Star filed for receivership and on 13 January 1991 at 8:30pm, the network was re-branded back to Network Ten with the first version of its famous ten watermark logo. The network entered liquidation in May 1991. In 1992, the network's flagship stations were sold to the Canadian-based Canwest media group, which held a controlling stake in the network until 2009. Also in 1992, the network commenced a strategy of targeting younger audiences. The Adelaide and Perth stations were re-acquired by the network in 1995.

1995–2007: Recovery and success
With the network having financially recovered, Ten Network Holdings floated on the Australian Stock Exchange in 1998. At this time, Ten had affiliate broadcasting agreements with Southern Cross Broadcasting in southern New South Wales, regional Victoria and Tasmania, and with Telecasters Australia in northern New South Wales and regional Queensland.

In 2001, Ten opened the doors to the Big Brother Australia house and with it reality television. The opening night of Big Brother became the most watched programs of the night. The trend was then followed by launching the Australian version of reality singing competition format Idols called Australian Idol in 2003. Australian Idol was a hit for several years, lasting until 2009.

In 2004, Network Ten enjoyed its best year since the 1970s, winning two ratings weeks (out of 40) and finishing second nationally only behind the Nine Network and well ahead of the Seven Network. This was a departure from previous years, in which it typically places third behind Nine and Seven in most other ratings years since 2000.

In 2005, Canwest was in discussions with newspaper publisher John Fairfax Holdings about a possible sale of the network, after the federal government indicated it may consider relaxing Australia's media cross-ownership laws. Previously, newspaper owners could not own television stations in the same city. Fairfax owned the Seven Network until 1988, and had been looking for a way back into television for a long time.

On 21 August 2005, the network celebrated its 40th birthday with a two-hour highlights package called Ten: Seriously 40, which was hosted by Bert Newton and Rove McManus.

On 27 October 2005, Network Ten announced that its long-running morning talk-variety program Good Morning Australia would be cancelled at the end of the year after a fourteen-year run. This ended host Bert Newtons 14-year association with Network Ten, although he was offered ongoing employment with the network, he announced that he would be returning to the Nine Network. 9am with David & Kim replaced GMA as Ten's national morning program from 2006 to 2009.

From 2006 to 2008, Ten was the official broadcaster of Sydney New Year's Eve. The rights returned to the Nine Network from 2009.

On 7 August 2007, Network Ten and Foxtel signed a new agreement allowing Ten's digital signal to be transmitted via Foxtel's cable and satellite services. Prior to this, Ten was only transmitted via cable on Foxtel in an analogue format and Austar in standard definition digital via Mystar. Similarly in October 2007, Network Ten and Optus announced that Ten's digital signal would be available on its cable network from 1 December 2007.

On 16 December 2007, Ten HD was officially launched as a breakaway channel, becoming the first new commercial television channel in metropolitan areas of Australia since 1988. Ten HD ceased broadcasting on 25 March 2009 when it was replaced by what was a sports-only high-definition channel, One HD.

2009–2015: Canwest sale, multichannels launch 
On 24 September 2009, Canwest announced that it was selling its 50.1% stake in Ten Network Holdings for $680 million, to pay down its significant debt. In late 2009, Canwest filed for creditor bankruptcy protection, due to CA$4 billion mounting debt across radio, television broadcasting and publishing assets in several countries.

On 20 October 2010, four years after he sold his shares in PBL Media to private equity firm CVC Asia Pacific, James Packer purchased 16 per cent of Ten.

Network Ten launched a new digital channel, Eleven, on 11 January 2011. The channel is aimed at a "distinctly youthful" audience between the ages of 13 and 29. Neighbours and The Simpsons were high-profile programs migrating from Ten to the new channel. The channel was a joint venture with CBS Studios International, which owned a 33% stake.

On 8 May 2011, Ten relaunched its sports based channel One, with general entertainment programming aimed at males taking over the schedule. It is aimed at a similar audience to 7mate.

In 2012, Ten unsuccessfully launched many new programs. This led to Ten's ratings dropping to fourth place behind ABC TV for over thirty straight nights. The poor performance resulted in Chief Programming Officer David Mott's resignation.

In late 2012, Ten reported a loss of $12.9m as it battled poor advertising markets and failed to hold larger audience numbers. They made positions at the station redundant and said that production may become centralised.

Analogue broadcasts ceased in the regions on 10 December 2013.

On 15 June 2015, Foxtel (co-owned by News Corp) bought 15% shares in Ten Network Holdings, pending the approval from the ACCC. Prior to the acquisition, Discovery backed out from bidding partnership with Foxtel. In July 2015, Paul Anderson was announced as the new chief executive officer.

2016–2017: New affiliation and financial troubles
A high-definition simulcast of 10 was revived on 2 March 2016. As a result, One, now known as 10 Bold, began broadcasting in standard definition only.

On 29 April 2016, the Nine Network pulled its regional affiliation with WIN Television over a lawsuit involving its catch-up service 9Now, and announced a new affiliation agreement with Southern Cross Austereo, Ten's then-primary regional affiliate. Ten subsequently negotiated a five-year affiliation deal with WIN; the new affiliations took effect on 1 July, with WIN becoming the carrier of Network Ten programming in regional Queensland, Northern NSW, Southern NSW, Victoria, Tasmania, South Australia, Western Australia, the Australian Capital Territory and the Gold Coast. WIN owner and Ten's largest shareholder Bruce Gordon positioned himself to increase his ownership stake in Ten, subject to changes to media ownership laws being passed.

Following Ten Network Holdings reporting a $232 million half year loss, billionaire shareholders Lachlan Murdoch, Bruce Gordon and James Packer withdrew support for $250 million guaranteed loan that would help keep Ten out of receivership. This loan was intended to replace an existing guaranteed $200 million loan that was due to expire in December. On 13 June, Ten asked the Australian Securities Exchange that their stock be placed in a 48-hour trading halt while it assessed its options concerning receivership. It went into voluntary administration the following day.

On 28 August 2017, Ten's administrators announced that the U.S. media company CBS Corporation (which had a 33% share in the multichannel Eleven and was Ten's largest creditor) had entered into a binding agreement to purchase the company for $123 million. CBS refinanced Ten's existing debt including guarantor fees to billionaire shareholders James Packer, Lachlan Murdoch and Bruce Gordon, and existing loans from the Commonwealth Bank. Shareholders in Ten Network Holdings lost their investment.

Gordon and Murdoch had also placed their own joint bid for the company, which was not endorsed by the administrators. At a meeting held on 12 September, Ten's creditors overwhelmingly voted in support of CBS' bid, citing concerns over Murdoch's previous management of Ten and talk of mass job cuts in the news department under Murdoch/Gordon ownership.

The CBS acquisition was completed on 16 November 2017, when the shares of Ten Network Holdings were transferred to CBS Network Ten BV, a company registered in the Netherlands.

2017–present: CBS ownership and merger with Viacom, rebrand as Paramount Global
Following the CBS acquisition, the network became a division of CBS Studios International. Ten moved to commission more Australian content. The additional programs were financed by the savings from the dissolution of Ten's output agreement with 21st Century Fox. CBS also moved to re-establish an in-house advertising sales department for 2019, bringing to an end Ten's four-year period with the Foxtel-affiliated Multi Channel Network (MCN). One reason CBS acquired Ten was to assist the company to launch its CBS All Access streaming service in the Australian market. The service launched in December 2018 and was branded 10 All Access in the local market.

On 31 October 2018, the network unveiled a new logo, replacing the "ten" wordmark used since 1991 with a stylised circle 10, and the network now referred to in text as Network 10. The new brand is used across all of Network 10's platforms and services, and was intended to reflect the broadcaster's positioning as an "adventurous alternative" with a "sense of fun". 10 also relaunched its multichannels Eleven and One as 10 Peach and 10 Boss, with Boss focusing on dramatic programming and targeting an older adult audience, and Peach continuing to be targeted towards young adults. 10 Boss was forced to change its name to 10 Bold on 10 December 2018 due to trademark conflicts with Fairfax Media.

On 4 December 2019, CBS Corporation completed a re-merger with fellow media conglomerate Viacom as ViacomCBS; the two companies had previously separated in 2005. ViacomCBS subsequently began to integrate the companies' operations in Australia; in a reorganization of the ViacomCBS Networks International division, Network 10 would join its new sister network in the United Kingdom, Channel 5 (previously owned by Viacom) as part of ViacomCBS Networks UK & Australia in January 2020. The following month, it was announced that the former Viacom channels in Australia would be brought under the Network 10 sales department, moving away from Foxtel Media (formerly MCN) in April. Network 10 also began to co-commission new programmes with Channel 5, including the drama miniseries Lie With Me and documentary series The Royals Revealed. In February 2022, it similarly announced that it had ordered a spin-off of CBS's drama franchise NCIS that would be set in Sydney.

On 13 July 2020, it was announced that Network 10 would launch a third digital channel, 10 Shake, on 27 September. The network will carry children's programmes in the daytime hours (drawing primarily television from Nickelodeon), while evening and prime time hours will feature "edgy" series and films targeting young adults, including television programmes from Comedy Central and MTV, and CBS late-night talk show The Late Late Show with James Corden.

In March 2021, 10 announced that it would return to Southern Cross Austereo as its regional affiliate in most markets beginning on 1 July 2021, in a deal that will last at least two years. The agreement reversed 10's 2016 move to WIN, which had announced a long-term agreement to return to the Nine Network.

On 15 February 2022, it was announced that ViacomCBS would be rebranding as Paramount Global as part of a wide rebrand strategy. Following this announcement, the ViacomCBS Networks International division was rebranded as Paramount Networks International. Network 10 joined Channel 5 as part of the rebrand of its respective division, now going under the name of Paramount Networks UK & Australia.

Programming

Local programs
Ten's current Australian program line-up consists of series such as: Bondi Rescue, Australian Survivor, I'm A Celebrity...Get Me Out of Here!, The Masked Singer Australia, Gogglebox Australia (with Foxtel's Lifestyle), Studio 10, RPM, Sports Tonight, The Amazing Race Australia, The Project, The Living Room, Ambulance Australia, Todd Sampson's Body Hack, Hunted, Shaun Micallef's Brain Eisteddfod, MasterChef Australia, The Bachelor Australia, The Bachelorette Australia, Bachelor in Paradise Australia, Have You Been Paying Attention?, The Cheap Seats, Dive Club, The Dog House Australia, First Dates, Would I Lie to You?, The Real Love Boat, The Challenge: Australia, The Traitors, The First Inventors and Territory Cops.

International programs
Current American programming that airs on 10 and its digital multichannels is sourced from 10's deals with sister company Paramount Global Content Distribution / MTV Networks and Nickelodeon International (long running, Nickelodeon shows only; also shared with Paramount+), Miramax, DreamWorks Pictures (selected films only), Roadshow Entertainment / Warner Bros. International Television Distribution and Warner Bros. Entertainment Inc, STX Entertainment, Lionsgate Films, Lantern Entertainment and Transmission Films. When it was independent, 10 had a long-standing relationship with Paramount Global Content Distribution (then CBS Studios International) for Australian rights to its content.

On 30 October 2017, the network ceased broadcasting its studio output deal as a side effect of the network's bankruptcy and CBS acquisition. The network that would go on to lose their deal with 20th Century Fox, and with it, the network's TV rights to The Simpsons, Modern Family, Fresh Off the Boat and Life in Pieces, among many others.

In 2018 however, 10 would create a new acquired programming deal with Warner Bros. and Roadshow Entertainment, granting the network programming rights which they currently share with the Nine Network.

Shared overseas programs
Sharing programs is currently a new rule for all the networks after a very, very long absence which have their own programs from 1990s to 2014. All the networks can now share the programs again with each networks of televisions and films, including splitting up the different seasons of the same television series or franchise. Also some television brands can split the different seasons of the same television series by aired on both networks.

Shared American programming which airs on 10 and the Seven Network and its digital multi-channels are sourced from 10 and Seven's deals with Warner Bros. International Television Distribution / Warner Bros. Entertainment Inc.

Shared American programming which airs on 10 and the Nine Network and its digital multi-channels are sourced from 10 and Nine's deals with Paramount Global Content Distribution / MTV Networks and Nickelodeon International (Nickelodeon shows only), Miramax, DreamWorks Pictures (selected films only), Lionsgate Films, Roadshow Entertainment / Warner Bros. International Television Distribution and Warner Bros. Entertainment Inc.

Shared American programming that airs on 10 and ABC and its digital multi-channels are sourced from 10 and ABC's deals with Paramount Global Content Distribution / Nickelodeon International (Nickelodeon shows only) and Warner Bros. International Television Distribution / Warner Bros. Entertainment Inc.

Former programs
The network formerly broadcast catalogue movie and television titles from Sony Pictures produced in the 1990s prior to 2020, NBCUniversal from 1988 to 2016, Metro-Goldwyn-Mayer from the late 1990s to 2004, DreamWorks Animation from 2012 to 2019, Nickelodeon Movies from 1998 to 2019 and Touchstone from 2017 to 2022. MGM, NBCUniversal, DreamWorks Animation, Nickelodeon Movies, and Sony now belong to the Nine Network, While Touchstone and Sony now belong to the Seven Network. Nine revived MGM, NBCUniversal, DreamWorks Animation, Nickelodeon Movies, and Sony broadcast rights, while Seven revived Touchstone and Sony broadcast rights.

In 2009, Network 10 lost the rights to Universal Pictures after more than 20 years of movies and television broadcasting when the Seven Network won the $500 billion and long-term deal with the movie and television studio broadcast TV rights.

From 2017 onwards, rival film and television rights with 20th Century Fox from 2007 to 2017 and Regency Enterprises from 2015 to 2017. Fox (now 20th Century Studios) and Regency now belong to the Seven Network and Nine Network, Seven and Nine revived 20th Century Fox and Regency broadcast rights.

News and current affairs

Network 10's news service is called 10 News First (previously Ten News & Ten Eyewitness News). It produces local bulletins each weeknight and national bulletins on weekday afternoons and weekends.

The news service also produces nightly panel show The Project.

Ten has access to sister service CBS News for international news coverage.

During weekday overnights and Sunday mornings, Network 10 rebroadcasts American television network CBS's (sister network since 2017) morning news program CBS Mornings.

In November 2006, Network 10 struck a deal with CBS, reportedly worth A$6 million a year. This allows Network Ten the rights to air all CBS News footage, as well as access to its 60 Minutes, Dr. Phil, Late Show with David Letterman and 48 Hours programs. This deal occurred after CBS's talks with the Nine Network broke down, with Nine refusing to pay A$8 million a year to continue its 40-year deal with CBS. Ten in turn struck a cheaper deal, and has onsold CBS's 60 Minutes stories to Nine.

On 31 July 2012, Entertainment Tonight was picked up by Network 10 after airing since 1982 until 30 June 2012 on the Nine Network following cutbacks on overseas purchases.

In late 2012, 10 reported a loss of $12.9m as it battled poor advertising markets and failed to hold larger audience numbers. They made positions at the station redundant and said that production may become centralised.

Sport

The network is a major player in Australian sports broadcasting. All sports broadcasts on 10 and its multichannels are labelled under the 10 Sport brand. Since the ViacomCBS takeover however, the channel has significantly toned down its commitment to sports programming.

In 2002, 10 combined with the Nine Network and Foxtel to acquire broadcast rights for the Australian Football League, the elite Australian rules football competition, displacing the Seven Network which had held the rights for more than 40 years. 10 broadcast Saturday afternoon and Saturday night games and had exclusive rights for all finals games. Along with the Seven Network, 10 placed a successful $780 million bid to jointly broadcast the game from 2007 to 2011. Under this deal, 10 continued to broadcast the Saturday component of the competition. However, unlike the previous deal, 10 did not hold the exclusive rights to the finals series. Instead, the networks shared the broadcasting of the finals series and alternated the broadcast of the grand final. In the years when 10 did not televise the Grand Final (2008 and 2010), it telecast the pre-season Grand Final and the Brownlow Medal presentation. 10 ended AFL broadcasting after 10 years at the conclusion of the 2011 season.

10 broadcast the 2007 Rugby World Cup.

In 2003, 10 started broadcasting the Formula One World Championship after the Nine Network dropped the rights in 2002 after more than twenty years of coverage.

All Big Bash League games was broadcast in Australia by 10. In 2013, 10 paid $100 million for BBL rights over five years, marking the channel's first foray in elite domestic cricket coverage. Ten previously held the broadcast rights to the Indian Premier League.

10, in joint partnership with subscription television provider Foxtel, had broadcast rights for the 2010 Commonwealth Games.

10 acquired broadcast rights to the 2014 Winter Olympics in Sochi, Russia for AUD$20 million after all three major commercial networks pulled out of bidding on rights to both the 2014 and 2016 Olympic Games due to cost concerns. The Nine Network had lost AUD$22 million on its joint coverage of the 2012 Games with Foxtel, and the Seven Network's bid was rejected for being lower than what Nine/Foxtel had previously paid.

In 2018, 10 signed the rights to the Melbourne Cup Carnival, after the Seven Network ended the rights for 17 years.

In 2019, 10 broadcast the 2019 Rugby World Cup.

In 2021, 10 acquired the rights to a range of football content, most notably both A-League Men and Women competitions as well as Socceroos and Matildas games. The deal also included content from the AFC, which includes the AFC Champions League and other World Cup qualifiers in the AFC region involving non-Australian teams, among others. Football content will be broadcast across both Paramount+ and free-to-air platforms.

Availability
Network 10 is available in standard definition and in 1080i high definition. Core programming is fibre fed out of ATV Melbourne to its sister stations and regional affiliates with TEN Sydney providing national news programming. The receiving stations and affiliates then insert their own localised news and advertising which is then broadcast in metropolitan areas via Network 10's owned-and-operated stations TEN Sydney, ATV Melbourne, TVQ Brisbane, ADS Adelaide, and NEW Perth.

The network's programming is also carried into regional Australia by various affiliate stations, including Southern Cross 10, WIN Television, Mildura Digital Television, Tasmanian Digital Television, Darwin Digital Television, Central Digital Television and West Digital Television.

In addition to this, 10 is retransmitted via Foxtel's cable and satellite pay television services.

10 HD

The 10 HD multichannel was launched on 16 December 2007 until 25 March 2009 and later revived on 2 March 2016. It broadcasts identical programming to 10, but in 1080i HD.

10 Play
The network's free video on demand and catch up TV service is called 10 Play. Launched on 29 September 2013, it replaced the network's old website that offered limited catch-up TV services. The service is available on the web and via apps for mobile devices, smart TVs, set-top boxes and video game consoles.

Live streaming of Network 10's primary channel commenced on 21 January 2016, although it was available only during selected hours. 24 hour live streaming of the main channel commenced on 26 January 2018. A live stream of 10 Bold was available on a part-time basis until 21 February 2019. On 21 February 2019, 10 Bold switched to an 24-hour live stream and 10 Peach was added to the 10 Play live stream service. On 27 September 2020, 10 Shake was added to the 10 Play live stream service.

10 News First during Olympics and Commonwealth Games are not accessible through 10 Play live streaming service due to the digital broadcast rights being owned by IOC rights.

Paramount+

10 All Access was launched on 4 December 2018 as an ad-free subscription streaming service. It was a rebranded, localised version of CBS All Access. The service offered programming from 10 and CBS's libraries, original programming, a livestream of CBS News and the ability to watch select CBS programmes prior to their broadcast on 10's channels.

In August 2020, following the re-merger of CBS Corporation and Viacom, ViacomCBS revealed plans to launch a new international streaming brand using the CBS All Access infrastructure, which would include CBS All Access and Showtime original programmes, Paramount Pictures films, other ViacomCBS library content, and content contributed from local subsidiaries. It was stated that existing Paramount Plus streaming services in Latin America and Nordic Europe, as well as 10 All Access, would be migrated to the then-unnamed service.

On 16 September 2020, it was officially announced that 10 All Access would be rebranded as Paramount+ in mid-2021. On 7 May 2021, it was announced that Paramount+ would launch on 11 August. ViacomCBS also announced that the second season of Five Bedrooms would premiere on Paramount Plus' launch date and that Australian original series including Spreadsheet, Last King of the Cross and movie 6 Festivals were in production for the platform.

Controversy
For the 2006 series of Big Brother, Ten appointed two censors to review the show instead of one. The Federal Minister for Communications, Senator Helen Coonan, was reported to have said that she would be keeping a "close watch on the show's 2006 series". This controversy resulted in Big Brother Uncut being renamed Big Brother: Adults Only for the 2006 season of Big Brother. In two separate findings, the Australian Communications and Media Authority determined Network Ten breached clause 2.4 of the Commercial Television Industry Code of Practice. These two breaches were in relation to the broadcast of Big Brother Uncut on 30 May, 13 June and 4 July 2005. The broadcast material was not classified according to the Television Classification Guidelines.

Despite toning down Big Brother: Adults Only significantly in comparison to 2005, the series continued to attract controversy.  After Big Brother: Adults Only was abruptly cancelled several weeks early, a subsequent incident of alleged sexual assault in the house saw the removal of two housemates and a huge public outcry calling for the series to be cancelled entirely. This incident generated significant publicity for the show, even prompting the Prime Minister of Australia to call on Network Ten to "do a bit of self-regulation and get this stupid program off the air."

Just prior to the fifth anniversary of the 9/11 attacks, Network Ten broadcast 911: In Plane Site, a documentary that examined conspiracy theories about the terrorist attacks.  Federal Labor politician Michael Danby demanded that the programming director of the station be sacked.

On 8 October 2008, the Australian Communications and Media Authority (ACMA) found Network Ten guilty of breaching the Commercial Television Industry Code of Practice by using subliminal advertising during the broadcast of the 2007 ARIA Music Awards on 28 October 2007. Network Ten had inserted single frames (lasting 1/25th of a second) into the program broadcast. This was exposed on ABC's Media Watch program.

Logo and identity history
From 1964 to 1984 Network Ten's four stations – ATV-0/ATV-10 Melbourne, TEN-10 Sydney, TVQ-0 Brisbane and SAS-10 Adelaide – used different logos to identify themselves. There had also been a number of network-wide logos used from the mid-1960s through to the early 1980s.

By late-1985 ATV-10, SAS-10 and TEN-10 were all using the same logo – a circle with "TEN" in the centre, somewhat in the style of a neon sign. This logo had been introduced by TEN-10 on 16 January 1983, was adopted by ATV-10 in June 1984 and by SAS-10 in November 1985. The logo was also similar to the new logo adopted by Brisbane's TVQ-0 in April 1983, when that station became branded as TV0 – a neon sign-style circle with "TV" in the centre.

Kicking off several years of branding upheaval, on 24 January 1988 ATV-10, ADS-10 and TEN-10 all adopted the "X TEN" logo, followed by Perth's NEW-10 when the station launched in May of that year, and finally TVQ-0 on 10 September, when the station changed frequency and became TVQ-10. On 23 July 1989, the network rebranded again to "10 TV Australia".

On 13 January 1991, the network introduced a new logo featuring a lowercase "ten" in a circle; four variations of this logo would appear over the next 27 years. The first version consisted of a white, silver or metallic ring enclosing a blue circle with "ten" in yellow lower case text. A revision of the logo with a yellow ring was introduced with the "Give Me Ten" ident campaign in 1995, but the white/silver/metallic ring was reintroduced with the network's 1997 idents. It was not until 1 October 1999 when the "Electric" ident was launched that the ring became yellow permanently.

In January 2008, the logo was enhanced for HD with a glossy "ball" effect similar to the logo of American network ABC. On 22 June 2013, the logo changed again, when the ring and lettering became blue as well.

On 31 October 2018, Ten unveiled a completely new logo, in its first major rebranding since 1991. The new branding replaced the "ten" wordmark with a numeric 10 in a circle. The "10" used in the logo is similar to those of American local TV stations WBNS-TV and WTSP. Coincidentally, the stations are affiliates of the CBS television network in the U.S., albeit as affiliates owned by Tegna Inc. as opposed to owned-and-operated stations part of CBS Television Stations.

Slogans
The 0–10 Network (1970–1980)

1970: Make Love, Not Revolution! (Used as a response to the Seven Network's "Revolution" campaign)
1974–1975: First In Color (Melbourne/Sydney/Adelaide only)
1976: The Big Parade! (Melbourne/Brisbane only, based on “Seventy-Six Trombones” from the musical “The Music Man”)
1977: I Like It! (Based on the song by Silver Convention)
Summer 1977/78: Keep Your Eye On The Circle, Keep Your Eye On The 0! (Melbourne/Brisbane only)
1979–1980: Come Up to TEN! (Sydney/Adelaide only)

Network Ten (1980–2018)
1980 (Melbourne), 1981 (Adelaide): You're on Top with Ten!
1983–1984: You're Home on Ten (Melbourne/Sydney/Adelaide only, used on and off by ATV-10 in 1985–86, only as station ID music)
1985–1986: It's Your Home on Ten!/'Cause You're Home on Ten (Melbourne/Adelaide only)
1985–1988: Ten out of Ten Australia - We Give You Ten (Sydney/Adelaide only)
1988: We're For You! (Ten's for You!)
24 January 1988 – 23 July 1989: X TEN (also used for Capital Television after aggregation for Southern NSW/ACT from March–July 1989, not used in Brisbane until Sept. 1988)
1989: Something's Going On Around Here! c/w Look! You've Got a Friend on TEN
23 July 1989 – 13 January 1991: 10 TV Australia (also used for Capital Television)
1990–1994: The Entertainment Network (also used for Star Television in 1990 and Capital Television from 1991 to 1994)
Summer 1990/1991: Channel Ten's Summer of Entertainment!
1991: That's Entertainment! (used elements from CBS's "Get Ready 1990" video. Also used for Capital Television and QTV)
1992: This Is It! (borrowed lyrical elements from ABC's "America's Watching ABC" and visuals from Fox's "It's on FOX!" video. Also used by Northern Rivers Television NRTV)
1993: It's on Ten! (borrowed from FOX's 1990 slogan)
1994: That's Ten! (also used by Ten Capital)
February 1995 – November 1997: Give Me Ten!
Summer 1997/98: Have a Cool Summer
February 1998 – August 1999: Turn Me On Ten
September 1999 – November 2000: Ten.
Summer 2000/01: Let Ten Entertain You...
11 February 2001 – 22 January 2012: Seriously Ten
Summer 2009/10: Summer's Looking Good!
2012 (22 January – 6 May): Turn It On (based on the song by David Guetta feat. Nicki Minaj)
1 January 2014 – 31 October 2018: Turn on 10
1 August 2014: 10, Celebrating 50 Years Young

Network 10 (2018–present)

31 October 2018 – 23 October 2019: TV with a Twist
23 October 2019 – 15 October 2020: Now You're Talking
15 October 2020 – 12 July 2022: There's No Place Like 10
12 July 2022 – present: TV That's So Good
6 October 2022 – present: A Mountain of Entertainment (shared with Paramount+ streaming service, referencing Paramount Pictures' iconic logo)

See also

 List of Australian television series
10 Peach
10 Bold
10 Shake

Notes

References

External links

 
Television networks in Australia
Television channels and stations established in 1964
1964 establishments in Australia
English-language television stations in Australia
Paramount International Networks
2017 mergers and acquisitions